Shiping County is a county in the Honghe Hani and Yi Autonomous Prefecture in the southern part of the Yunnan province, China.

Notable sights
The county features many gardens and colorful murals. Yilong Lake, a large fresh water lake with a surface area of 32 square km, is particularly notable for its scenery, including the colorful lotus flowers that bloom on its surface.

The Xiushan Temple is located southwest of the county seat. It was constructed during the Tang dynasty and renamed Xiushan Temple during the Ming dynasty.

Administrative divisions
In the present, Shiping County has 7 towns and 2 townships. 
7 towns

2 townships
 Xincheng
 Daqiao

Ethnic groups
Shiping County has the following ethnic groups (Shiping County Gazetteer 1990:655-669).

Yi people
Niesupo  (exonym: Sandaohong ; 90,000 people)
Niesupo (exonym: Huayao ; 26,000 people)
Pula  (about 100 people)
Shansu  (about 100 people)
Hani people
Dai people
Hui people
Bai people
Han people

Culture
The county is known throughout China for its traditional dances and songs. The Yi people of Shiping County who live near Yilong Lake perform a form of traditional music called .

Cuisine
Agricultural products include fruits such as 
oranges and yangmei (Myrica rubra).

Notable residents
The Qing dynasty scholar and civil servant Yuan Jiagu (1872–1937) lived in Shiping County, and his home was named on November 16, 1993, for preservation as a “provincial level cultural relic”.

Climate

See also
Zhengying, a village in Baoxiu, Shiping

References

 
County-level divisions of Honghe Prefecture